Sir Keith Douglas Seaman  (11 June 1920 – 30 June 2013) was Governor of South Australia from 1 September 1977 until 28 March 1982. He was the second successive governor to have been a minister of religion, Seaman being a minister in then recently merged Uniting Church in Australia.

Life
Seaman was born in McLaren Vale, South Australia, on 11 June 1920.

Seaman's term as governor was not without controversy. On 24 February 1978, The Advertiser in Adelaide reported that he was about to be dismissed. He was not, but was forced to admit that he had committed a "grave impropriety" prior to his appointment; it had been examined by the Uniting Church discipline committee and he had been allowed to continue his ministry.

Before being appointed governor, Seaman had been superintendent of the Adelaide Central Methodist Mission (now Uniting Communities, formerly UnitingCare Wesley Adelaide), and in 1973 was a member of the National Commission on Social Welfare under Marie Coleman which was set up by Prime Minister Gough Whitlam.

Seaman died at his home in 2013, aged 93.

References

External links
, The Bulletin, 2002.
Prime Minister's press conference, 3 April 1973, announcing National Commission on Social Welfare. www.whitlam.org, retrieved 2008-10-10.

Governors of South Australia
Uniting Church in Australia ministers
1920 births
2013 deaths
Australian Knights Commander of the Royal Victorian Order
Australian Officers of the Order of the British Empire